The 2017 JSM Challenger of Champaign–Urbana was a professional tennis tournament played on hard courts. It was the twenty-second edition of the tournament which was part of the 2017 ATP Challenger Tour. It took place in Champaign, Illinois, United States between November 13 and November 18, 2017.

Singles main-draw entrants

Seeds

 1 Rankings are as of November 6, 2017.

Other entrants
The following players received wildcards into the singles main draw:
  Aron Hiltzik
  Jared Hiltzik
  Dennis Nevolo
  Aleksandar Vukic

The following players received entry from the qualifying draw:
  Samuel Monette
  Ronnie Schneider
  Alexander Ward
  Mikael Ymer

Champions

Singles

 Tim Smyczek def.  Bjorn Fratangelo 6–2, 6–4.

Doubles

 Leander Paes /  Purav Raja def.  Ruan Roelofse /  Joe Salisbury 6–3, 6–7(5–7), [10–5].

References

JSM Challenger of Champaign-Urbana
JSM Challenger of Champaign–Urbana
Champaign
2017 in sports in Illinois